The Blue Ridge Southern Railroad  is a Class III shortline railroad operating over  of track in Western North Carolina. The railroad is owned by Watco of Pittsburg, Kansas, and operates three lines that connect in the Asheville area that were previously owned by Norfolk Southern. The railroad is based out of Canton, North Carolina, and utilizes 11 locomotives. Operations began on 26 July 2014.

History

The Blue Ridge Southern Railroad was formed on 25 June 2014 when Watco reached a definitive agreement with Norfolk Southern for the purchase of 91.8 miles of branchlines in Western North Carolina. The railroad began operations with a fleet of 11 diesel electric locomotives, which consist of three SD40-2s, four SD40M-2 rebuilds, and four GP39-2s.

The announcement to sell the lines that would become the Blue Ridge Southern Railroad was made in a Norfolk Southern corporate meeting in April 2014.

Lines operated

Roster

Operations
Blue Ridge Southern Train Symbols

Radio operations
The Blue Ridge Southern Railroad conducts radio operations for train crews and maintenance on frequencies 160.2150, 160.3350, 160.7700, 160.8000 and 161.0250.

See also

References

Further reading

External links
Blue Ridge Southern Railroad

North Carolina railroads
Railway companies established in 2014
2014 establishments in North Carolina
Spin-offs of the Norfolk Southern Railway
Transportation in Jackson County, North Carolina
Transportation in Haywood County, North Carolina
Transportation in Buncombe County, North Carolina
Transportation in Transylvania County, North Carolina
Transportation in Henderson County, North Carolina